The American Revolutionary War was a war of independence between the Kingdom of Great Britain and the United States that was fought from April 19, 1775 to September 3, 1783. The war was fought as part of the broader American Revolution, in which the Thirteen Colonies made a declaration of independence in response to disputes regarding political representation. The conflict took place in the present-day Eastern United States, which the Thirteen Colonies successfully defended with the assistance of French, Dutch, and Spanish support. American victory led to the creation of the United States.

Background 

 Colonial history of the United States
 French and Indian War
 American Enlightenment
 American Revolution
 No taxation without representation
 Boston Tea Party

Acts of Great Britain 

 Royal Proclamation of 1763
 Sugar Act 1764
 Currency Act
 Quartering Acts
 Quartering Act 1765
 Quartering Act 1774
 Stamp Act 1765
 Declaratory Act
 Revenue Act of 1766
 Townshend Acts
 New York Restraining Act 1767
 Revenue Act 1767
 Indemnity Act 1767
 Commissioners of Customs Act 1767
 Vice Admiralty Court Act 1768
 Tea Act 1773
 Intolerable Acts
 Boston Port Act
 Massachusetts Government Act
 Administration of Justice Act 1774
 Quartering Act 1774
 Quebec Act
 Conciliatory Resolution
 Restraining Acts 1775
 New England Trade and Fisheries Act
 Trade Act 1775
 Proclamation of Rebellion
 Prohibitory Act

Participants

Great Britain 

  Kingdom of Great Britain
 Cherokee
  Hessians
  Iroquois Confederacy
 Cayuga
 Mohawk
 Onondaga
 Seneca
 Mi'kmaq
 Muscogee
 Odawa
 Shawnee
 Susquehannock
 Loyalists fighting in the American Revolution

United States 

  United States of America
 Connecticut
 Delaware
 Georgia
 Maryland
 Massachusetts
 New Hampshire
 New Jersey
 New York
 North Carolina
 Pennsylvania
 Rhode Island
 South Carolina
 Virginia
 Abenaki
 Catawba
 Cheraw
 Chickasaw
 Choctaw
  Kingdom of France
 Lenape
 Mi'kmaq
 Mohicans
 Oneida
 Pedee
 Seminole
 Tuscarora
  Vermont Republic

Support from 

  Dutch Republic
  Kingdom of Spain

Neutral parties 

 Nantucket during the American Revolutionary War era
  Russia and the American Revolution

Campaigns and theaters 
Conflicts between forces of at least 1,000 soldiers are denoted in bold.

Northern theater

Boston campaign 

 Powder Alarm (September 1, 1774)
 Battles of Lexington and Concord (April 19, 1775)
 Battle of Menotomy (April 19, 1775)
 Siege of Boston (April 19, 1775 – March 17, 1776)
 Battle of Chelsea Creek (May 27, 1775 – May 28, 1775)
 Battle of Bunker Hill (June 17, 1775)
 Battle of Machias (June 11, 1775 – June 12, 1775)
 Fortification of Dorchester Heights (March 4, 1776 – March 5, 1776)
 Battle off Fairhaven (May 14, 1775)
 Battle of Gloucester (August 8, 1775)
 Burning of Falmouth (October 18, 1775)
 Knox Expedition (November 17, 1775 – January 25, 1776)

Invasion of Quebec 

 Capture of Fort Ticonderoga (May 10, 1775)
 Siege of Fort St. Jean (September 17, 1775 – November 3, 1775)
 Battle of Longue-Pointe (September 25, 1775)
 Benedict Arnold's expedition to Quebec (September 11, 1775 – November 9, 1775)
 Battle of Quebec (1775) (December 31, 1775)
 Battle of Saint-Pierre (March 25, 1776)
 Battle of the Cedars (May 18, 1776 – May 27, 1776)
 Battle of Trois-Rivières (June 8, 1776)
 Battle of Valcour Island (October 11, 1776)

Nova Scotia campaign 

 Raid on St. John (August 27, 1775)
 Raid on Charlottetown (November 17, 1775 – November 18, 1775)
 Raid on Yarmouth (December 5, 1775)
 Raid on Canso (September 22, 1776 – November 22, 1776)
 Battle of Fort Cumberland (November 10, 1776 – November 29, 1776)
 Battle off Yarmouth (March 28, 1777)
 St. John River expedition (June 2, 1777 – June 30, 1777)
 Capture of USS Hancock (July 8, 1777 – July 9, 1777)
 Battle off Liverpool (April 24, 1778).
 Battle off Halifax (July 10, 1780)
 Battle of Blomindon (May 21, 1781)
 Action of 21 July 1781 (July 21, 1781)
 Raid on Annapolis Royal (August 29, 1781)
 Battle off Halifax (May 28, 1782 – May 29, 1782)
 Raid on Chester (June 30, 1782)
 Raid on Lunenburg (July 1, 1782)

New York and New Jersey campaign 

 Battle of Long Island (August 26, 1776)
 Landing at Kip's Bay (September 15, 1776)
 Battle of Harlem Heights (September 16, 1776)
 Battle of Pell's Point (October 18, 1776)
 Battle of Mamaroneck (October 22, 1776)
 Battle of White Plains (October 28, 1776)
 Battle of Fort Washington (November 16, 1776)
 Battle of Fort Lee (November 20, 1776)
 Ambush of Geary (December 14, 1776)
 Battle of Iron Works Hill (December 22, 1776 – December 23, 1776)
 Battle of Trenton (December 26, 1776)
 George Washington's crossing of the Delaware River (December 25, 1776)
 Battle of the Assunpink Creek (January 2, 1777)
 Battle of Princeton (January 3, 1777)
 Battle of Millstone (January 20, 1777)

Saratoga campaign 

 Siege of Fort Ticonderoga (1777) (July 2, 1777 – July 6, 1777)
 Battle of Hubbardton (July 7, 1777)
 Battle of Fort Anne (July 8, 1777)
 Siege of Fort Stanwix (August 2, 1777 – August 22, 1777)
 Battle of Oriskany (August 6, 1777)
 Battle of Bennington (August 16, 1777)
 Battles of Saratoga
 Battle of Freeman's Farm (September 19, 1777)
 Battle of Bemis Heights (October 7, 1777)
 Battle of Forts Clinton and Montgomery (October 6, 1777)
 Burning of Kingston (October 16, 1777)

Philadelphia campaign 

 Battle of Bound Brook (April 13, 1777)
 Battle of Short Hills (June 26, 1777)
 Battle of Staten Island (August 22, 1777)
 Battle of Cooch's Bridge (September 3, 1777)
 Battle of Brandywine (September 11, 1777)
 Battle of the Clouds (September 16, 1777)
 Battle of Paoli (September 20, 1777)
 Siege of Fort Mifflin (September 26, 1777 – November 16, 1777)
 Battle of Germantown (October 4, 1777)
 Battle of Red Bank (October 22, 1777)
 Battle of Gloucester (November 25, 1777)
 Battle of White Marsh (December 5, 1777 – December 8, 1777)
 Battle of Matson's Ford (December 11, 1777)
 Battle of Quinton's Bridge (March 18, 1778)
 Clow Rebellion (April 14, 1778 – April 17, 1778)
 Battle of Crooked Billet (May 1, 1778)
 Battle of Barren Hill (May 20, 1778)
 Battle of Monmouth (June 28, 1778)

Northern theater after Saratoga 

 Battle of Cobleskill (May 30, 1778)
 Battle of Wyoming (July 3, 1778)
 Attack on German Flatts (September 17, 1778)
 Baylor massacre (September 27, 1778)
 Battle of Edgar's Lane (September 30, 1778)
 Raid on Unadilla and Onaquaga (October 2, 1778 – October 16, 1778)
 Carleton's Raid (October 24, 1778 – November 14, 1778)
 Cherry Valley massacre (November 11, 1778)
 Battle of Stony Point (July 16, 1779)
 Battle of Minisink (July 19, 1779 – July 22, 1779)
 Sullivan Expedition (June 18, 1779 – October 3, 1779)
 Battle of Newtown (August 29, 1779)
 Boyd and Parker ambush (September 13, 1779)
 Battle of Paulus Hook (August 19, 1779)
 Battle of Young's House (February 3, 1780)
 Battle of Connecticut Farms (June 7, 1780)
 Battle of Springfield (June 23, 1780)
 Battle of Bull's Ferry (July 20, 1780 – July 21, 1780)
 Royalton raid (October 16, 1780)
 Battle of Klock's Field (October 19, 1780)
 Battle of Pine's Bridge (May 14, 1781)
 Battle of Johnstown (October 25, 1781)

Southern theater

Gulf Coast campaign

Yorktown campaign

Western theater 

 Siege of Fort Henry (September 1777)
 Siege of Boonesborough (September 7, 1778 – September 18, 1778)
 Siege of Fort Vincennes (February 23, 1779 – February 25, 1779)
 Siege of Fort Laurens (February 22, 1779 – March 20, 1779)
 Battle of Chillicothe (May 1779)
 Battle of St. Louis (May 25, 1780)
 Bird's invasion of Kentucky (May 25, 1780 – August 4, 1780)
 Battle of Piqua (August 8, 1780)
 La Balme's Defeat (November 5, 1780)
 Brodhead's Coshocton expedition (April 1781)
 Lochry's Defeat (August 24, 1781)
 Long Run massacre (September 13, 1781 – September 14, 1781)
 Gnadenhutten massacre (March 8, 1782)
 Battle of Little Mountain (March 22, 1782)
 Crawford expedition (May 25, 1782 – June 12, 1782)
 Siege of Bryan Station (August 15, 1782 – August 17, 1782)
 Battle of Blue Licks (August 19, 1782)
 Siege of Fort Henry (September 11, 1782 – September 13, 1782)
 Battle of Arkansas Post (April 17, 1783)

Illinois campaign 

 Clark's journey down the Ohio (May 12, 1778 – May 27, 1778)
 Occupation of the Illinois Country (June 1778)
 Hamilton retakes Vincennes (December 17, 1778)
 Clark's trek to Vincennes (February 1779)
 Siege of Fort Sackville (February 23, 1779 – February 25, 1779)

Atlantic theater

People

Leaders 

 Great Britain
 Head of state: George III
 Head of government:
 Frederick North, Lord North
 Charles Watson-Wentworth, 2nd Marquess of Rockingham
 William Petty, 2nd Earl of Shelburne
 Commander-in-Chief of the Forces:
 Jeffery Amherst, 1st Baron Amherst
 Henry Seymour Conway
 United States
 Commander-in-chief: George Washington
 France
 Absolute monarch: Louis XVI

Military forces 

 Continental Army
 United States militia units
 Continental Navy
 British Army
 Royal Navy

Demographics 

 African Americans in the Revolutionary War
 Black Loyalist
 Dunmore's Proclamation
 Philipsburg Proclamation
Jewish Americans in the Revolutionary War
Native Americans in the Revolutionary War
Women in the American Revolutionary War

Practices 

 Financial costs of the American Revolutionary War
 Intelligence in the American Revolutionary War
 Prisoners of war in the American Revolutionary War

Diplomacy 

 Letters to the inhabitants of Canada
 Conciliatory Resolution
 Olive Branch Petition
 Treaty of Watertown
 Staten Island Peace Conference
 Franco-American alliance
 Treaty of Alliance
 Carlisle Peace Commission
 Treaty of Fort Pitt
 First League of Armed Neutrality
 Treaty of Paris

Outlines of wars
Wikipedia outlines
American Revolutionary War
American Revolution-related lists